The Minister for Youth was a minister in the New South Wales Government with responsibility for providing a whole-of-government approach to  youth issues in New South Wales, Australia.

It was first established in 1956 as the Minister for Child Welfare in the third ministry of Joe Cahill, with the principal responsibility being the care of neglected, orphaned and delinquent children through the Child welfare department. The department had existed since 1881 initially under the Colonial Secretary. The portfolio was held in conjunction with that of Social Welfare until 1973 when they were combined as the portfolio of Youth and Community Services. Youth Affairs were part of the responsibilities of the Minister for Education from 1988 until 1995 when a separate portfolio was re-created as the Minister Assisting the Premier on Youth Affairs. The youth portfolio was abolished in 2011. A new portfolio of regional youth was established in 2019.

List of ministers 
The following individuals have been appointed Minister for Youth or any precedent titles:

References

Youth